Claro or CLARO may refer to:

Companies
 Claro (company) or Claro Americanas, a mobile and fixed voice and data communications company
Claro Argentina, Paraguay and Uruguay
Claro Brasil
Claro Colombia
Claro El Salvador
Claro Guatemala
Claro Jamaica
Claro Puerto Rico
Claro (Dominican Republic)
Claro fair trade, a sustainable company established by EvB and based in Switzerland
Claro TV, a Latin American operator of Pay television

Places
Claro, Switzerland, a place in the canton of Ticino
Claro Wapentake, the former district of Yorkshire

Other uses
Clarion (instrument), a medieval brass instrument also called Claro
CLARO (political party), a political party in Orihuela, Spain
Claro (surname), a surname (includes a list)
Claro TV, a Latin American pay television operator
Claro, a light-colored cigar wrapper
The wood of the Juglans hindsii, sometimes called claro walnut

See also
Claros, an ancient Greek sanctuary on the coast of Ionia, Greece
Rio Claro (disambiguation)
Clairo (born 1998), American lo-fi musician